Ninghe District, formerly Ninghe County, is a district of the municipality of Tianjin, People's Republic of China, located in the rural northeast part of the municipality.

Administrative divisions
There are 11 towns and 3 townships in the district:

Climate

References

Districts of Tianjin